This is a timeline of the history of the city of Gloucester, Massachusetts, USA.

Prior to 19th century
 1606 - Samuel de Champlain anchors in "Beauport."
 1623 - Dorchester Company settlers arrive and setup at Stage Fort Park.
 1630 or 1631 - Abraham Robinson, son of John Robinson (pastor), and band of Pilgrims, establishes settlement and fishing stage at Annisquam.
 1642 - Town of Gloucester incorporated.
 1660 - Edward Harraden house built.
 1698 - First school house built, Thomas Riggs first school master.
 1700 - Congregational Church organized, West Gloucester (approximate date).
 1709 - Davis-Freeman house built.
 1710 - White-Ellery House built.
 1713 - Schooner ship type begins operating.
 1716 - Second Parish Church incorporated.
 1720 - Dyke-Wheeler house built.
 1728 - Third Parish Church established.
 1739 - "Great meeting-house at the harbor" built.
 1740 - Babson-Alling house built.
 1765 - Population: 3,763.
 1770 - Freemason Tyrian Lodge established.
 1771 - Cape Ann Light erected on Thacher Island.
 1775 - Battle of Gloucester.
 1789 - U.S. custom house established.
 1790 - Population: 5,317.
 1792 - Gloucester post office established.
 1796 - Gloucester Bank established.

19th century

1800s-1850s

 1801 - Annisquam Harbor Light erected.
 1805 - Daily Boston-Gloucester stagecoach begins operating.
 1806 - First Universalist Church built.
 1808 - First Baptist Church founded.
 1819 - Nearby Essex incorporated as a town.
 1821 - Ten Pound Island Light erected.
 1827 - Gloucester Telegraph newspaper begins publication.
 1828 - First Parish Church built on Middle Street.
 1830
 Gloucester Lyceum and Lanesville Congregational Church established.
 30 September: Fire.
 Population: 7,510.
 1831 - Eastern Point Light erected.
 1832 - Gloucester Circulating Library, Front Street, in operation.
 1834 - Gloucester Democrat newspaper begins publication.
 1835 - Straitsmouth Island Light erected.
 1836 - Female Charitable Society organized.
 1838
 Methodist Church built.
 Congregationalist Ladies' Sewing Circle organized.
 1839 - Annisquam Universalist Ladies' Sewing Circle organized.
 1840
 Part of Gloucester becomes the new town of Rockport.
 Population: 6,350.
 1842 - Lane's Cove Pier Co. formed.
 1843 - Cape Ann Light newspaper begins publication.
 1844 - Town Hall built.
 1845 - Odd Fellows Ocean Lodge established.
 1847
 Railway begins operating.
 Gloucester Mutual Fishing Insurance Co., Gloucester Marine Insurance Co., and Annisquam Mutual Fire Insurance Co. incorporated.
 Artist Fitz Hugh Lane moves to town.
 1848
 Gloucester News newspaper begins publication.
 Mount Adnah Cemetery organized.
 1849 - Fitz Henry Lane house and Pavilion Hotel built.
 1850
 Burnham Brothers Marine Railway built.
 Population: 7,786.
 1851 - Cape Ann Savings Bank incorporated.
 1852 - Company G., 8th Regiment organized.
 1853 - Gloucester Gas Light Company in business.
 1855
 Gloucester Cornet Band organized.
 Cunningham & Thompson in business.
 Timothy Davis becomes US representative for Massachusetts's 6th congressional district.
 1856
 Oak Grove Cemetery, Independent Sons of Temperance, and Cape Ann Bank established.
 Cape Ann Advertiser newspaper begins publication.
 1857
 Procter Brothers in business.
 Citizens' Library Association organized.
 1858
 Police court, Cape Ann Telegraph Co., Congregationalist Young Ladies' Society, and Congregationalist Ladies' Society at the Cove established.
 East Gloucester Baptist Church built.
 1859
 Gloucester Fishermen's Widow's and Orphan's Fund Society; Sons of Temperance, Annisquam Division; Franklin Club; Congregationalist Ladies' Home Missionary Society; and Band of Hope organized.
 November 2: "Mechanic Engine Co. had a grand parade."

1860s-1890s

 1860 - Population: 10,904.
 1861 - Railway to Rockport begins operating.
 1862 - Shute & Merchant in business |url=http://www.shuteandmerchant.com/history-2.html  |
 1864
 February 18: Fire.
 First National Bank in business.
 1865 - Freemason Acacia Lodge established.
 1866
 Board of Trade and Cape Ann Horticultural Society established.
 Cape Ann Anchor & Forge in business.
 1867
 North Gloucester Universalist church active.
 Sylvanus Smith & Co. in business.
 1869
 May 16: Town Hall burns down.
 Cape Ann Granite quarry in business.
 1870
 Universalist Centenary.
 Population: 15,389.
 1871 - Gloucester City Hall built.
 1872 - Gloucester Lyceum & Sawyer Free Library incorporated.
 1873
 Gloucester becomes a city.
 Lanesville Granite quarry in business.
 YMCA and Cape Ann Scientific and Literary Association founded.
 1874
 Slade Gorton & Company established.
 Robert R. Fears becomes first city mayor.
 Procter Brothers circulating library opens.
 1877
 Gloucester Bulletin newspaper begins publication.
 Artist William Morris Hunt active.
 1880
 Sea Side Library in operation.
 Population: 19,329.
 1881
 Gloucester Water Supply Co. incorporated.
 Harbor Methodist Church built.
 Gloucester Isinglass and Glue in business.
 1882 - Russia Cement Co. in business.
 1884
 Gloucester News and Cape Ann Breeze newspapers begin publication.
 Tarr and Wonson paint factory built.
 Magonolia Library Association formed.
 1885
 October 16: North Shore Tricycle Run arrives in Gloucester.
 Horse-drawn Gloucester Street Railway begins operating.
 1887 - Magnolia Congregational Church and Gloucester Co-operative Bank established.
 1888
 Gloucester Daily Times newspaper begins publication.
 Gloucester Electric Co. in business.
 1891
 Gloucester Safe Deposit and Trust in business.
 Hawthorne Inn built.
 1892
 250th anniversary of incorporation of town of Gloucester.
 Gloucester Towboat Co. in business.
 1895
 Gloucester, Essex and Beverly Street Railway begins operating.
 American Halibut Co. in business.
 1896 - Eliot house (residence) built.
 1897 - Addison Gilbert Hospital built.
 1898
 S.S. Portland shipwreck.
 Business Men's Association formed.
 1899 - Ravenswood Park established.
 1900 - Population: 26,121.

20th century

 1902 - Cape Pond Ice Co. in business.
 1905 - Gloucester Cold Storage in business.
 1906 - Gorton-Pew Fisheries in business.
 1907
 Gloucester Net and Twine Company in business.
 Beauport, Sleeper-McCann House expanded.
 Shute & Merchant became the fifth firm to join the Gorton-Pew Fisheries Company |url=http://www.shuteandmerchant.com/history-2.html  |
 1914
 Our Lady of Good Voyage Church rebuilt.
 Synagogue active.
 1920 - Population: 22,947.
 1921 - Chamber of Commerce established.
 1922 - North Shore Art Association founded.
 1923
 Tercentenary of European settlement of Gloucester.
 Gloucester Tercentenary Permanent Memorial Association selects Leonard Craske's design for the Gloucester Fisherman's Memorial.
 1925 - General Seafood Corporation in business.
 1926 - Adventure (schooner) launched.
 1929 - Hammond Castle built.
 1943 - WPA murals painted in City Hall. 

 1969 - Gloucester Fishermen's Wives Association founded.

 1976 - [[citizens voted to change the City Charter replacing  a city manager with a mayor elected every two years. Leo Alper was the first mayor elected under the new city charter. 
 1979 - Gloucester Stage Company founded.
 1984 - Richard Silva elected mayor.
 1988 - William Squillace elected mayor.
 1991
 October 28: Ship Andrea Gail lost at sea in the 1991 Perfect Storm.
 Bruce Tobey becomes mayor.
 1992 - William S. Rafter Jr. becomes mayor.
 1994 - Bruce Tobey becomes mayor again.
 1997 - John F. Tierney becomes US representative for Massachusetts's 6th congressional district.
 1998 - City website online (approximate date).

21st century

 2002 
 North Shore North - Newspaper Begins (Mike Ryan, James Oliver, Gregg B. Smith)
 John Bell becomes mayor.
 2003 Gloucester Island News - Newspaper Begins (James Oliver, Gregg B. Smith)
 2004 - Sister city relationship established with Tamano, Japan.
 2007 - Good Morning Gloucester blog begins publication.
 2008
 Teen pregnancy controversy occurs.
 Carolyn Kirk becomes mayor.
 2010 - Population: 28,789.
2013 - Gloucester Marine Genomics Institute (GMGI) founded.
 2015
 Police department program for drug addicts begins.
 Sefatia Romeo Theken becomes mayor.
 Seth Moulton becomes US representative for Massachusetts's 6th congressional district.

See also
 Gloucester history
 List of mayors of Gloucester, Massachusetts
 Timelines of other municipalities in Essex County, Massachusetts: Haverhill, Lawrence, Lynn, Newburyport, Salem

References

Bibliography

published in the 18th-19th century
 
 
 
 
 
 
  (ongoing). 
 1893, 1894
 
 
 
 
 
 
 
 
 
  (children's fiction)
 

published in the 20th-21st century
  (ongoing). 
 1900, 1903, 1905, 1909
 1911, 1916
 1920, 1922
 
 
 
 
 . + Chronology

External links

 Gloucester City Archives
 Works related to Gloucester, various dates (via Digital Public Library of America).

Gloucester, Massachusetts
gloucester